"N95" is a song by American rapper Kendrick Lamar. It was sent to Italian radio airplay through PGLang, Top Dawg Entertainment, Aftermath Entertainment, and Interscope Records as the lead single from his fifth studio album, Mr. Morale & the Big Steppers, on May 20, 2022. The song was produced by Boi-1da, Sounwave, and Jahaan Sweet, while it was additionally produced by Lamar's cousin, fellow American rapper and record producer Baby Keem.

Composition and lyrics
"N95" has been described as "a seething cultural critique where Lamar spits bile in multiple directions over a bleakly catchy, bass-driven instrumental". Lyrically, Lamar raps about masks that go with expensive clothing rather than the N95 respirator mask that was used during the outbreak of COVID-19, as he raps: "Take all that designer bullshit off and what do you have? Bitch you ugly as fuck". During the bridge, Lamar uses a verse that was originally intended for the song "Vent" from his cousin Baby Keem's album The Melodic Blue (2021), yet did not make the cut.

Critical reception
Chase McMullen of Beats Per Minute drew a comparison between "N95" and "the blistering raps of" Lamar's fourth studio album, Damn (2017). The Guardian music critic Alexis Petridis noted that "the tone of his delivery changes so dramatically and so often that it sounds less like the work of one man than a series of guest appearances". NME music critic Kyann-Sian Williams saw the song as "the most high-octane track" from Mr. Morale & the Big Steppers, which includes "a plethora of zippy one-liners and humour, which you might not expect sandwiched between piercing commentary on materialism and society".

Music video
Lamar was seen filming a music video in September 2020, which would later be confirmed as scenes of "N95" (said scenes were Lamar floating above the ocean and using a phone booth). The official music video for "N95", directed by Lamar himself and Dave Free, was released on May 14, 2022. Similar to his music video for "Element", the video features heavy imagery in the form of a wide range of scenes. At the beginning of the video, a sign reads "This Shit Hard" in big red capital letters and appears a few more times throughout the video. Scenes include Lamar in a Jesus-like crucified pose floating over ocean waves, Lamar doing workouts on the roof of a dilapidated apartment, Lamar running from a horde of black men (which serves as a reference to Childish Gambino's music video for "This Is America"), an example of the 20th century doll experiments, Lamar and Baby Keem walking through a hallway (the latter suddenly kissing the former on the cheek, causing both of them to stop in their tracks), Lamar using a phone booth, and more.

Credits and personnel

 Kendrick Lamar – vocals, songwriting
 Boi-1da – production, songwriting
 Sounwave – production, songwriting
 Jahaan Sweet – production, songwriting
 Baby Keem – additional production, songwriting
 Manny Marroquin – mixing
 Anthony Vilchis – mixing assistance
 Trey Station – mixing assistance
 Zach Pereyra – mixing assistance
 Andrew Boyd – recording assistance
 Sedrick Moore II – recording assistance
 Joe Visciano – engineering
 Matt Schaeffer – engineering

Charts

Weekly charts

Year-end charts

Release history

References

2022 singles
2022 songs
Kendrick Lamar songs
Songs written by Kendrick Lamar
Songs written by Boi-1da
Songs written by Sounwave
Songs written by Sam Dew
Song recordings produced by Boi-1da
Trap music songs
Top Dawg Entertainment singles
Aftermath Entertainment singles
Interscope Records singles